Plays Electronica by One Cello is the first solo album by the Finnish cellist and composer Max Lilja. The 10 track album was self-released by the artist on 12 April 2013. According to the artist: "An album of electronic cello music created by using cello as the only sound source." A music video with images of paintings by a Finnish artist Antti Rönkä was released for the opening track "I Sound My Sound".

Track list:
I Sound My Sound
Now
A State Of Mind
Count Phase
Like This
It Is In
The End
You Me
Qualified
In SoS

References

2013 albums
Max Lilja albums